Nash is a census-designated place and unincorporated community in Walsh County, North Dakota, United States. Its population was 32 as of the 2010 census. The unincorporated community is located in Farmington Township, northwest of Grafton.

Nash was designated as part of the U.S. Census Bureau's Participant Statistical Areas Program on March 31, 2010. It was not counted separately during the 2000 Census, but was included in the 2010 Census, where a population of 32 was reported.

History
Nash was founded in 1890 as a station along the Great Northern Railroad and named for the Nash brothers, pioneer settlers in the area who operated a fruit store in Grafton and started what is now the Nash Finch Company, the third-largest food wholesaler in the United States.

Geography
Nash is located at  (48.470556, -97.513056).

Demographics

2010 census
As of the census of 2010, there were 32 people, 12 households, and 9 families in the CDP. The racial makeup of the CDP was 93.8% White, and 6.3% from other races. Hispanic or Latino of any race were 28.1% of the population.

There were 12 households, of which 25.0% had children under the age of 18 living with them, 50.0% were married couples living together, 16.7% had a female householder with no husband present, 8.3% had a male householder with no wife present, and 25.0% were non-families. 16.7% of all households were made up of individuals, and 8.3% had someone living alone who was 65 years of age or older. The average household size was 2.67 and the average family size was 3.11.

The median age in the CDP was 37.5 years. 25.0% of residents were under the age of 18; 12.5% were between the ages of 18 and 24; 15.6% were from 25 to 44; 37.5% were from 45 to 64; and 9.4% were 65 years of age or older. The gender makeup of the CDP was 50.0% male and 50.0% female.

References

Census-designated places in North Dakota
Census-designated places in Walsh County, North Dakota
Populated places established in 1890
1890 establishments in North Dakota
Unincorporated communities in North Dakota
Unincorporated communities in Walsh County, North Dakota